Alexander Baird Burt (9 April 1884 – 1967) was a Scottish field hockey player who competed in the 1908 Summer Olympics as a member of the Scottish team, which won the bronze medal. His brother, John, also was a member of the Scottish team.

References

External links
 
Alexander Burt's profile at databaseOlympics
Alexander Burt's profile at Sports Reference.com

1884 births
1967 deaths
Scottish male field hockey players
Olympic field hockey players of Great Britain
British male field hockey players
Field hockey players at the 1908 Summer Olympics
Olympic bronze medallists for Great Britain
Olympic medalists in field hockey
Scottish Olympic medallists
Medalists at the 1908 Summer Olympics